Markus Böckermann (born 14 January 1986) is a German Olympic volleyball player. He competed in men's beach volleyball with partner Lars Flüggen at the 2016 Summer Olympics.

References

External links 
 

1986 births
Living people
German men's beach volleyball players
Olympic beach volleyball players of Germany
Beach volleyball players at the 2016 Summer Olympics
Sportspeople from Hamburg